Michel Rivera Medina, commonly known as "La Zarza Ali", is a Dominican professional boxer who has held the IBF–USBA lightweight title since 2020.

Professional career 
Rivera made his professional debut on 19 March 2016, scoring a third-round technical knockout (TKO) victory against Gregory Estevez at the Gimnasio Pedro Cruz in Santiago de los Caballeros, Dominican Republic.

After compiling a record of 15–0 (10 KOs), he made his U.S. debut in June 2019, defeating then-unbeaten René Téllez Girón via eight-round unanimous decision (UD) at the WinnaVegas Casino Resort in Sloan, Iowa.

His next fight came against Jose Luis Gallegos in September. At the pre-fight weigh in, Gallegos failed to weigh inside the 136 lbs weight limit and was subsequently fined $1600 by the California State Athletic Commission (CSAC), with half going to Rivera and the other half to the CSAC. Rivera won the bout via fifth-round TKO after referee Marcos Rosales called a halt to the contest before the commencement of the sixth round. After the fight, Rivera visited Gallegos in his dressing room to return the $800 he gained from the fine.

He next faced Fidel Maldonado Jr for the vacant WBC Continental Americas lightweight title on 1 February 2020, at the Beau Rivage Resort & Casino in Biloxi, Mississippi. After knocking his opponent to the canvas in the tenth round, Rivera followed up with a sustained attack which prompted referee Keith Hughes to call a halt to the contest, handing Rivera his first regional title via tenth-round TKO.

Rivera won his second regional title in his next bout, defeating Ladarius Miller via ten-round UD on 31 October, capturing the vacant IBF–USBA lightweight title at the Alamodome in San Antonio, Texas.

Rivera fought thrice in 2021. In his first fight of the year, on 27 February 2021, Rivera faced Anthony Mercado Raices. He won the fight by a late eight-round knockout. Five months later, on 3 July 2021, Rivera knocked out Jon Fernandez in the eight round of a twelve round bout. Rivera finished the year with a unanimous decision win against Jose Matias Romero on 30 October 2021.

Rivera defeated Joseph Adorno via ten-round UD on 26 March, 2022 at the Minneapolis Armory in Minneapolis, USA.

Michel Rivera suffered the first defeat of his professional career, losing by unanimous decision to Frank Martin on 17 Dec, 2022 at the Cosmopolitan of Las Vegas, Chelsea Ballroom in Las Vegas, USA. Rivera who dressed like his idol Mohammed Ali was floored in round 7 by Frank Martin en route to victory

Professional boxing record

References 

Living people
1998 births
Dominican Republic male boxers
Sportspeople from Santo Domingo
Lightweight boxers